David is a common masculine given name. It is of Yehudi origin, and its popularity derives from King David, a figure of central importance in the Hebrew Bible and in the religious traditions of Judaism, Christianity and Islam.

Etymology 
David means "beloved", derived from the root dôwd (דּוֹד), which originally meant "to boil", but survives in Biblical Hebrew only in the figurative usage "to love"; specifically, it is a term for an uncle or figuratively, a lover/beloved (it is used in this way in the Song of Songs: אני לדודי ודודי לי, "I am for my beloved and my beloved is for me").

David was adopted as a Christian name from an early period, e.g. David of Wales (6th century), David Saharuni (7th century), David I of Iberia (9th century).
Name days are celebrated on 8 February (for David IV of Georgia), 1 March (for St. David of Wales) and 29 December (for King David), as well as 25 June (St. David of Sweden), 26 June, 9 July (Russia), 26 August, 11 December and 30 December (Hungary, Latvia, Norway, Czech Republic).

Hypocorisms 
The oldest, most popular and most commonly used diminutive form in the English speaking countries of David is Dav, which first appeared in written form in the 16th century. The nickname Dav or Dave has been used as a name in its own right in the 19th and 20th centuries, at least in the United States. At the height of its popularity in the 1950s and early 1960s, the name Dave was bestowed upon more than 3,000 infants each year.

Other common English-language hypocorisms of the name David are Davey, Davie, and Davy. The Welsh Dafydd is also abbreviated Dewi, Dai and Daf.

In Ashkenazi Jewish culture, common hypocorisms of Dovid are Dovi and Dov. Dudi is a common hypocorism in Modern Hebrew.

Davo is also used as a nickname, and is quite common in Australia and Armenia, while the nickname Dato (for Davit) is popular in the country of Georgia.

Female forms 
Some female forms of the name are Daveigh, Davetta, Davida, and Davina. The girl's name Davinia may derive from David, but it has also been considered a derivation from the Gaelic Devin or a variant of Lavinia.

Statistics 
 United Kingdom: David was the most popular masculine given name in Northern Ireland for newborns in 1975 and dropped to a fluctuating rank around 20th in the first few years of the 21st century.
 United States: David is the third most popular masculine name in the United States. 10,905,563 (1 out of 28) Americans are named David. Approximately 92,597 Davids are born each year.
 United States: In 2015, the name David was the 18th most popular name for baby boys in the United States.

Variants 

 Afrikaans: 
 Amharic: 
 Arabic:
 Classical: 
 Modern: 
 Aramaic: 
 Armenian:
 Classical: 
 Eastern: 
 Western: 
 Assamese: , 
 Azerbaijani: , 
 Bashkir: 
 Basque: 
 Bosnian: , 
 Breton: 
 Bulgarian: , 
 Catalan: , 
 Cornish: 
 Croatian: 
 Czech: , 
 Danish: 
 Dutch: 
 Esperanto: 
 Estonian: , 
 Fijian: 
 Filipino: , 
 French: 
 Fula: , 
 Galician: 
 Ge'ez: 
 German: ,  (extremely rare)
 Greek:
 Modern: 
 Gujarati: 
 Hausa: , 
 Hebrew: Hebrew spelling without diacritics: , (rare)  or full diacritics:  (David)
 Biblical: (Dawid)
 Tiberian: (Dāwîḏ)
 Hindi: , 
 Hungarian: 
 Icelandic: 
 Indonesian: 
 Inuktitut: 
 Irish: , 
 Italian: 
 Japanese: , 
 Kannada: 
 Khmer: , 
 Korean: 
 Latin: , 
 Latvian: , 
 Lithuanian: , 
 Malay:
 Malaysian: , 
 Malayalam: 
 Macedonian: 
 Mandarin Chinese:
 Manx: 
 Māori: 
 Marathi: 
 Medieval English: Daw, Day
 Mi'kmaq: 
 Northern Sami: 
 Northern Sotho: , 
 Norwegian: 
 Persian:  or 
 Polish: 
 Portuguese: 
 Brazilian: 
 Punjabi: 
 Romanian: 
 Samoan: 
 Scots: , 
 Scottish Gaelic: , 
 Serbian: 
 Skolt Sami: 
 Slovak: , 
 Slovenian: 
 Spanish: 
 Swahili: 
 Swedish: 
 Syriac: 
 Tamil: 
 Telugu: 
 
 Tongan: 
 Turkish: , 
 Ukrainian:  (Davyd), Devid
 Urdu: , 
 Vietnamese: , 
 Yiddish: 
 Zulu:

Notable people with the name

See also 
 
 
 David (surname)
 Davide
 Dave (given name)
 Davy (given name)
 Davis (surname)
 Davies
 Kawika

References 

English masculine given names
French masculine given names
Romanian masculine given names
Bulgarian masculine given names
Hebrew-language names
Masculine given names
German masculine given names
Spanish masculine given names
Swedish masculine given names
Danish masculine given names
Russian masculine given names
Serbian masculine given names
Slovene masculine given names
Czech masculine given names
Dutch masculine given names
Georgian masculine given names
Montenegrin masculine given names
Modern names of Hebrew origin
Given names of Hebrew language origin

fr:David
hu:Dávid
fi:Taavetti (nimi)